The 2014 United States House of Representatives elections in Kentucky was held on Tuesday, November 4, 2014 to elect the six U.S. representatives from the state of Kentucky, one from each of the state's six congressional districts. The elections coincided with the elections of other federal and state offices, including an election to the U.S. Senate.

Overview
Results of the 2014 United States House of Representatives elections in Kentucky by district:

District 1
Ed Whitfield (Republican) was unchallenged so there was no Republican Primary.

Primary results

General election

Results

District 2
There were no primary challenges. Brett Guthrie is the Republican nominee and Incumbent. Ron Leach is the Democratic challenger.

General election

Results

District 3
Michael Macfarlane (Republican) was unchallenged so there was no Republican Primary.

Primary results

General election

Results

District 4
There were no primary challenges. Thomas Massie is the Republican nominee and Incumbent. Peter Newberry is the Democratic challenger.

General election

Results

District 5
Hal Rogers (Republican) was unchallenged so there was no Republican Primary.

Primary results

General election

Results

District 6
Republican Andy Barr has represented Kentucky's 6th congressional district since January 2013, having defeated Democratic incumbent Ben Chandler in the 2012 election.

Elisabeth Jensen, an education advocate, and Geoff Young, a former contractor who previously ran for the Kentucky House of Representatives 45th District on the Kentucky Green Party ticket, filed to run in the Democratic primary. Jensen was seen as the front-runner for the Democratic nomination. Jensen won the Democratic nomination in the primary with 61% of the vote.

Primary results

General election

Polling

Results

See also
 2014 United States House of Representatives elections
 2014 United States elections

References

External links
U.S. House elections in Kentucky, 2014 at Ballotpedia
Campaign contributions at OpenSecrets

Kentucky
2014
United States House of Representatives